Cysgod Rhyfel, also known as The Shadow of War, is a 2014 documentary film which explores the mental effects of conflict on former soldiers and their families. Predominantly in Welsh, the film was first broadcast on S4C on 18 May 2014. It was directed and produced by John Evans.

Commenting in an interview about the film Evans highlighted his motives for making the documentary when he said "I feel a sense of responsibility and an obligation to highlight the issues surrounding the experience of war and mental health issues faced by veterans…it's vital their stories are heard to help address the time bomb of men and women traumatized by war".

The film specifically addresses PTSD. Ifor ap Glyn was the film's executive producer.

Synopsis
After active service in Northern Ireland, the Falklands, Iraq and Afghanistan four veterans openly discuss their experiences of conflict and the psychological effects of war on their lives beyond the battlefield and how they live life after their wars and once they return home. The film uses a mixture of talking head testimony, archive and highly stylised dramatic sequences.

People featured in the film

Interviewed
 Maldwyn Jones, former Welsh Guard who saw service in Northern Ireland and the Falklands War. He survived the air assault on the Sir Galahad in 1982.
 Roy Rees, former Royal Corps of Transport soldier who served in Northern Ireland.
 Ryan Roberts, former Royal Army Medical Corps medic who served in Afghanistan and Iraq.
 Richard Jones, former Welsh Guard who served in Afghanistan.
 William Watkins, a veterans' therapist.
 Liza Roberts, Ryan's wife.

In photographs and sourced video
The film uses the personal photographs of the veterans who were interviewed as well as the last video message recorded by Welsh Guard L/Sgt Dan Collins. Collins had struggled with PTSD after serving in Afghanistan. He took his own life after leaving a video message to his mother Deana Collins.

Re-enactors
Iago McGuire
Jack Evans
Youssef Alkaddour
Seth Williams

References

External links

Welsh-language films
Films shot in Wales
Welsh films
British documentary films
Falklands War films
Documentary films about the Iraq War
Documentary films about the War in Afghanistan (2001–2021)
Documentary films about post-traumatic stress disorder
2014 television films
2014 films
Documentary films about veterans
Mental health in Wales
English-language Welsh films
2010s British films